Greater Cochin is the area defined by Greater Cochin Development Authority for town planning. This area consists of the Kochi UA region and its suburbs. The Greater Cochin Development Authority (GCDA) and Goshree Islands Development Authority (GIDA) are the nodal agencies that handles town planning and development within the Greater Cochin Area.

Definitions

Greater Cochin area consists of Cochin Corporation, 9 municipalities (Aluva, North Paravoor, Perumbavoor, Angamaly, Kalamassery, Thripunithura, Maradu, Thrikkakara, Eloor ), 25 intervening panchayats (Chellanam, Kumbalanghi, Cheranelloor, Varapuzha, Chennamangalam, Kadamakkudy, Mulavukad, Kadungalloor, Alengad, Chengamanad, Nedumbassery, Chottanikkara, Vadavucode-Puthencruz, Choornikkara, Edathala, Kumbalam, Kottuvally, Vypin Island, Cherai etc.) and scattered islands around Kochi City (Goshree Islands) covering an area of 732 km². This has a population of over 3.0 million (2011 census).

The state government and the GCDA have plans to include Mala and Kodungallur in Thrissur district; Piravom and Kolenchery, in Ernakulam district; Thalayolaparambu and Vaikom in Kottayam; and Cherthala in Alappuzha district within the Kochi metropolitan limits. The newly formed metropolis would be put under the charge of a new authority called Kochi Metropolitan Regional Development Authority.

See also
Kochi metropolitan area

References